was a women's football team which played in Division 1 of Japan's Nadeshiko League. It was founded in 1989 but disbanded five years later in 1994.

Honors

Domestic competitions

Empress's Cup All-Japan Women's Football Tournament
Champions (1) : 1979
Runners-up (2) : 1980, 1982

Results

Transition of team name
FC Jinnan : 1972 – 1985
Nissan FC Ladies : 1986 – 1994

References

External links
Japanese women's club teams

Women's football clubs in Japan
Association football clubs established in 1979
1994 disestablishments in Japan
Yokohama F. Marinos
Sports teams in Yokohama
Nissan
1979 establishments in Japan
Association football clubs disestablished in 1994